The Mount Ayliff Christmas Day Massacre, also known as the Mount Ayliff Killings, was a mass shooting which occurred on the morning of 25 December 2020. It took place in the village of Mount Ayliff in the Eastern Cape province of South Africa and resulted in the death of between seven to nine people. At least six people were reported injured in the attack. It was reported that most of the dead were from the nearby village of Nokhatshile. 

The cause of the event was reported to have been a dispute over minibus taxi routes between competing taxi operators.

The South African National Defense Force was called in to assist the police in the search for suspects as they had escaped into the surrounding area following the incident. The following day six suspects, injured in the incident, were arrested. Seven suspects appeared before the Mount Ayliff Magistrates Court on charges relating to the incident on 28 December 2020.

See also
Taxi wars in South Africa

References

2020 mass shootings in Africa
2020 murders in South Africa
21st-century mass murder in Africa
Mass shootings in South Africa
Massacres in 2020
2020s massacres in South Africa
November 2020 crimes in Africa
Eastern Cape
December 2020 events in South Africa